Tom or Thomas Manley may refer to:
Tom Manley (college president), President of Antioch College as of 2016
Tom Manley (footballer) (1912–1988), English footballer